Martin Emil Marty (born on February 5, 1928) is an American Lutheran religious scholar who has written extensively on religion in the United States.

Early life and education

Marty was born on February 5, 1928, in West Point, Nebraska, and raised in Iowa and Nebraska. He was a member of the Lutheran Church–Missouri Synod and was educated at Concordia College, Milwaukee, Wisconsin and Concordia Seminary, St. Louis, Missouri. Marty continued with graduate work, receiving a Doctor of Philosophy degree from the University of Chicago in 1956. He served as a Lutheran pastor from 1952 to 1967 in the suburbs of Chicago.

Career
From 1963 to 1998 Marty taught at the University of Chicago Divinity School, eventually holding an endowed chair, the Fairfax M. Cone Distinguished Service Professorship. His more than 130 doctoral advisees at the University of Chicago include M. Craig Barnes, James R. Lewis, Jeffrey Kaplan, Jonathan M. Butler, John G. Stackhouse Jr., and Vincent Harding, as well as Susan Henking, Shimer College president.

Marty served as president of the American Academy of Religion, the American Society of Church History, and the American Catholic Historical Association. He was the founding president and later the George B. Caldwell Scholar-in-Residence at the Park Ridge Center for the Study of Health, Faith, and Ethics. He has served on two US presidential commissions and was director of both the Fundamentalism Project of the American Academy of Arts and Sciences and the Public Religion Project at the University of Chicago sponsored by the Pew Charitable Trusts. He has served at St. Olaf College in Northfield, Minnesota, since 1988 as Regent, Board Chair, Interim President in late 2000, and since 2002 as Senior Regent.

Marty retired on his seventieth birthday. He holds emeritus status at the University of Chicago; he  served as Robert W. Woodruff Visiting Professor of Interdisciplinary Studies at Emory University 2003–2004. His first wife, Elsa, died and he married again, to Harriet. He has seven children (including two foster children), among whom are John Marty, a Minnesota State Senator, and Peter Marty, who hosted the ELCA radio ministry Grace Matters from 2005 to 2009; and is now publisher of The Christian Century magazine and senior pastor of St. Paul Lutheran Church in Davenport, Iowa.

The Martin E. Marty Award for the Public Understanding of Religion is named for Marty and has been awarded annually since 1996.

Awards and accolades
Marty has received numerous honors, including the National Humanities Medal, the Medal of the American Academy of Arts and Sciences, the University of Chicago Alumni Medal, the Distinguished Service Medal of the Association of Theological Schools, and 80 honorary doctorates.  In 1991, Marty was awarded an honorary Doctor of Humane Letters (LHD) degree from Whittier College.

Named in his honor, the Martin Marty Center for the Advanced Study of Religion is the University of Chicago Divinity School's institute for interdisciplinary research in all fields of the academic study of religion. He is an elected member of the American Antiquarian Society and of the American Philosophical Society and is the Mohandas M. K. Gandhi Fellow of the American Academy of Political and Social Sciences.

Marty was inducted as a Laureate of The Lincoln Academy of Illinois and awarded the Order of Lincoln (the State's highest honor) by the Governor of Illinois in 1998 in the field of Religion.

Works

Overview
Marty published an authored book and an edited book for every year he was a full-time professor. He maintained that authorial pace for the first decade of his retirement, slowing only in the second. His dozens of published books include Righteous Empire: The Protestant Experience in America (1970), for which he won the National Book Award in category Philosophy and Religion;
the encyclopedic five-volume Fundamentalism Project, co-edited with historian R. Scott Appleby, formerly his dissertation advisee; and the biography Martin Luther (2004). He has been a columnist and senior editor for The Christian Century magazine since 1956, edited the biweekly Context newsletter from 1969 until 2010, and writes a weekly column distributed electronically as "Sightings" by the Martin Marty Center at the University of Chicago Divinity School. In addition, he has authored over 5,000 articles and many more incidental pieces, encyclopedia entries, forewords, and the like.

Bibliography

Author
The New Shape of American Religion (1958) New York: Harper and Brothers
A Short History of Christianity, The World Publishing Company, Cleveland, Ohio (1959)
Righteous Empire: The Protestant Experience in America (1970) Harper Torchbook 1977 paperback: 
Protestantism (1972) Garden City, New York: Image Books. 
The Public Church: Mainline-Evangelical-Catholic (1981) New York: Crossroads. 
A Cry of Absence, Reflections for the Winter of the Heart, (1983) Harper & Row, 
Pilgrims in Their Own Land: 500 Years of Religion in America (1984) New York: Penguin. 
Modern American Religion. Chicago: University of Chicago Press.

Volume 1: The Irony of It All, 1893–1919 (1986) 
Volume 2: The Noise of Conflict, 1919–1941 (1990) 
Volume 3: Under God, Indivisible, 1941–1960 (1996) 
Religion and Republic: The American Circumstance (1987) Boston: Beacon Press. 
The Glory and the Power: The Fundamentalist Challenge to the Modern World. (1992) Beacon. Boston, Massachusetts.
The One and the Many: America's Struggle for the Common Good (1997) Harvard University Press. Cambridge, Massachusetts. 
Martin Luther (The Penguin Lives Series). New York: Viking (2004) 
Dietrich Bonhoeffer's Letters and Papers From Prison: A Biography (2011) Princeton University Press. Princeton, New Jersey. 
October 31, 1517: Martin Luther and the Day that Changed the World (2016) Paraclete Press. Brewster, Massachusetts.

Book chapters
Martin E. Marty. "Half a Life in Religious Studies: Confessions of an 'Historical Historian'." pp. 151–174 in The Craft of Religious Studies, edited by Jon R. Stone. New York: St. Martin's Press, 1998.

Articles and monographs
Marty, Martin E.  "Fundamentalism Reborn: Faith and Fanaticism."  Saturday Review. May 1980, 37–42.
Marty, Martin E.  "Fundamentalism as a Social Phenomenon."  Bulletin of the American Academy of Arts and Sciences 42 (November 1988): 15–29.
Marty, Martin E. "Too Bad We're So Relevant: The Fundamentalism Project Projected". The Bulletin of the American Academy of Arts and Sciences 49 (March 1996): 22–38.

Editor
The Place of Bonhoeffer: Problems and possibilities in his thought , Association Press, 1962.
The Fundamentalism Project, Martin E. Marty and R. Scott Appleby, Editors
Volume 1: Fundamentalisms Observed, Marty/Appleby, (1991) 
Volume 2: Fundamentalisms and Society: Reclaiming the Sciences, the Family, and Education, Marty/Appleby/Hardacre/Mendelsohn, (1993) 
Volume 3: Fundamentalisms and the State: Remaking Polities, Economies, and Militance, Marty/Appleby/Garvey/Kuran, (1993) 
Volume 4: Accounting for Fundamentalisms: The Dynamic Character of Movements, Marty/Appleby/Ammerman/Frykenberg/Heilman/Piscatori, (1994) 
Volume 5: Fundamentalisms Comprehended, Marty/Appleby, (1995) 
Hizmet Means Service: Perspectives on an Alternative Path Within Islam, University of California Press (2015).

See also
Franz Bibfeldt (fictitious theologian promoted by Marty)

References

External links
Martin E. Marty homepage
Fundamentalism Project
Sightings, a publication of the University of Chicago Divinity School's Martin Marty Center
Video interview on his book, The Mystery of the Child 
Download or listen to Martin Marty interview by The Progressive magazine, September 27, 2006
"Prison Writings in a World Come of Age: The Special Vision of Dietrich Bonhoeffer", Martin E. Marty, Berfrois, May 12, 2011

1928 births
American historians of religion
20th-century American Lutheran clergy
American Lutheran theologians
Evangelical Lutheran Church in America Christians
Living people
National Book Award winners
National Humanities Medal recipients
People from West Point, Nebraska
Presidents of the American Academy of Religion
Presidents of the American Society of Church History
Public theologians
St. Olaf College people
University of Chicago faculty
Concordia Seminary alumni
Members of the American Philosophical Society